Jonas Ogandaga (born 1 August 1975) is a Gabonese former professional footballer who last played as a midfielder.

He played for Petrosport, Sogara, Mbilinga, Raja Casablanca, Olympique Kef, Medenine, and Stade Mandji. He also played for the Gabon national team between 1993 and 2000. He played in three tournaments; the 1994, 1996 and 2000 African Cup of Nations.

References

Living people
1975 births
Gabonese footballers
Association football midfielders
Gabon international footballers
1994 African Cup of Nations players
1996 African Cup of Nations players
2000 African Cup of Nations players
Botola players
Tunisian Ligue Professionnelle 1 players
Petrosport F.C. players
Raja CA players
Olympique du Kef players
CO Médenine players
AS Stade Mandji players
Gabonese expatriate footballers
Gabonese expatriate sportspeople in Morocco
Expatriate footballers in Morocco
Gabonese expatriate sportspeople in Tunisia
Expatriate footballers in Tunisia
21st-century Gabonese people